C. V. Velappan was an Indian politician and former Member of the Legislative Assembly of Tamil Nadu. He was elected to the Tamil Nadu legislative assembly as a Dravida Munnetra Kazhagam candidate from Kabilarmalai constituency in 1967, and 1971 elections and as an Anna Dravida Munnetra Kazhagam candidate in 1980 election. He was from Kallipalayam.

References 

Dravida Munnetra Kazhagam politicians
All India Anna Dravida Munnetra Kazhagam politicians
Living people
Year of birth missing (living people)